The 1963 New Zealand general election was a nationwide vote to determine the shape of New Zealand Parliament's 34th term. The results were almost identical to those of the previous election, and the governing National Party remained in office.

Background
The 1960 election had been won by the National Party, beginning New Zealand's second period of National government. Keith Holyoake, who had briefly been Prime Minister at the end of the first period, returned to office.  The elderly leader of the Labour Party, Walter Nash, had agreed to step down following his government's defeat, but disliked the prospect of being succeeded by his Minister of Finance, Arnold Nordmeyer. Nash instead backed first Jerry Skinner and then, after Skinner's death, Fred Hackett. In the end, however, Nordmeyer was victorious. Nordmeyer, however, was unpopular with the general public, being remembered with hostility for the tax hikes in his so-called 'Black Budget'. Labour struggled to overcome this negative perception of its leader, and was only partially successful.

There had been an unusually large number of by-elections during the term of the 33rd Parliament. None of these had resulted in any upsets, and there was no major indications from the population wanting a change. National held two seats Hurunui and Waitaki, but by reduced margins. The party organisation was also acutely aware that National's win in 1960 was mostly due to public mood against Labour, rather than endorsement of National, and put work in to improving their campaigning. Benefits were seen sooner than expected picking up swings (but not winning) against Labour in two by-elections in the two Labour held seats of Buller and Northern Maori.

Holyoake started his election campaign on 4 November, not even a month out from the election. Whilst television had just been introduced in New Zealand, the election campaign was a dull affair and, from 23 November, the Assassination of John F. Kennedy was the dominant topic in the media.

MPs retiring in 1963
Five National MPs and two Labour MPs intended to retire at the end of the 33rd Parliament.

The election
The date for the main 1963 elections was 30 November. 1,345,836 people were registered to vote, and turnout was 89.6%. This turnout was around average for the time. The number of seats being contested was 80, a number which had been fixed since 1902.

The following new (or reconstituted) electorates were introduced in 1963: Manurewa, New Lynn, Pakuranga, Porirua, Rangiora, Taupo and Waimarino.

Results
The 1963 election saw the governing National Party retain office by a ten-seat margin. It had previously held office by a twelve-seat margin. National won a total of forty-five seats, while the Labour Party won thirty-five. In the popular vote, National won 47.1% to Labour's 43.7%. The Social Credit Party won 7.9% of the vote, but no seats. Four of their candidates also missed the nomination deadline. One political analyst, Professor Robert Chapman, called it "the no change election".

Puti Tipene Watene was elected for Eastern Maori; he was a Mormon and was the first non-Ratana to win a Maori seat since 1938.

Votes summary

The table below shows the results of the 1963 general election:

Key

|-
 |colspan=8 style="background-color:#FFDEAD" | General electorates
|-

|-
 | Hauraki
 | style="background-color:;" |
 | colspan=3 style="text-align:center;background-color:;" | Arthur Kinsella
 | style="text-align:right;" | 2,873
 | style="background-color:;" |
 | style="text-align:center;" | George Broad
|-

|-
 |colspan=8 style="background-color:#FFDEAD" | Māori electorates
|-

|}

Notes

References

Works cited

 
November 1963 events in New Zealand